

The Toolern Creek Trail is a shared use path for cyclists and pedestrians, which follows the Toolern Creek in the outer western suburb of Melton in Melbourne, Victoria, Australia.

Connections
North end at 
South end at

References

External links
 Friends of Toolern Creek
 Melton Shire Council - Trail Information

Bike paths in Melbourne